Théophile Bellando de Castro (1820–1903) was a lawyer from Monaco. He wrote the Monegasque anthem.

Early life
Théophile Bellando de Castro was born on 7 March 1820 in Monaco.

Career
Bellando de Castro was a lawyer.

Bellando de Castro wrote the "Hymne Monégasque," the national anthem of Monaco. The  "Hymne Monégasque" was first publicly performed in the fall of 1867, with music by fellow Monegasque Charles Albrecht. Bellando de Castro was awarded the Order of St. Charles.

Death
Bellando de Castro died on 16 May 1903 in Monaco.

See also
 Hymne Monégasque: Original lyrics

References

1820 births
1903 deaths
Monegasque lawyers
Monegasque writers
National anthem writers